The Topsportcentrum is an indoor sports arena, located in Almere, Netherlands. Designed by architectural studio ZJA, it opened on the 7th of October in 2007. Its operator is the city of Almere and its main hall has a capacity of 3,000 people. The sports it is used most for are volleyball and basketball, with VC Allvo and Almere Pioneers use the venue as their home arena. 

The hall was finished in 2007 and costed €14 million. From 2007 until 2013, the hall was used for the final of the NBB Cup, the main cup competition for men's basketball teams.

On 24 February 2020, Basketball Nederland announced the national basketball team will play its international home games in Almere until 2023.

Sporting events
 2007: NBB Cup Final
 2008: NBB Cup Final
 2009: NBB Cup Final
 2010: NBB Cup Final
 2011: NBB Cup Final
 2012: NBB Cup Final
 2013: NBB Cup Final
 2014: Superkombat World Grand Prix IV 2014
 2021: EuroHockey Indoor Club Cup

References

External links
Homepage

Buildings and structures in Almere
Sport in Almere
Sports venues in Flevoland
Badminton venues
Badminton in the Netherlands
Basketball venues in the Netherlands